Révolte dans les Asturies (in English: Revolt in Asturias) with the subtitle collective creation test, is a theatrical play, written collectively by Albert Camus, Jeanne-Paule Sicard, Yves Bourgeois and Alfred Poignant, in 1935. It was published in 1936 by Edmond Charlot. It describes the workers' uprising of 1934 in Asturias.

Plot
Revolt in Asturias describes the workers' insurrection of 1934, in Asturias. The miners' revolt began in Mieres, on the night of October 5, 1934. The center-right government of the second Spanish Republic called in the army. The repression, on October 19, caused between 1500 and 2000 victims, including 300 to 400 soldiers.  laborers were imprisoned.

References

1930 plays
Plays by Albert Camus